Diocletianopolis or Diokletianoupolis may refer to a number of places in the ancient world named after Emperor Diocletian.

Diocletianopolis (Palestine), in modern Israel
Diocletianopolis (Thebais), in modern Egypt
Diocletianopolis (Thrace), in modern Bulgaria
 Diocletianopolis (Kastoria) in Greece
 Diocletianopolis (Pella) in Greece

See also
 Dioclea (disambiguation)
 Doclea (disambiguation)